David Kevin Standing (born 21 October 1963) is an English former cricketer.  Standing was a right-handed batsman who bowled right-arm off break.  He was born at Brighton, Sussex.

Standing made his first-class debut for Sussex against Middlesex in the 1983 County Championship.  He made 42 further first-class appearances for the county, the last of which came against Middlesex in the 1988 County Championship.  In his 43 first-class matches for Sussex, he scored a total of 1,130 runs at an average of 18.83, with a high score of 65.  One of five first-class half centuries he made, this score came against Warwickshire in 1986.  With the ball, he took just 6 wickets at an expensive bowling average of 120.83, with best figures of 2/28.

Standing didn't make his debut in List A cricket for the county until 1985, when he featured against the touring Zimbabweans.  He made twenty further List A appearances for the county, the last of which came against Derbyshire in the 1988 NatWest Trophy.  In his 21 List A appearances, he scored a total of 71 runs at an average of 17.75, with a high score of 42 not out.  With the ball, he took 16 wickets at an average of 28.81, with best figures of 3/28.

References

External links
David Standing at ESPNcricinfo
David Standing at CricketArchive

1963 births
Living people
Sportspeople from Brighton
English cricketers
People educated at Hove Grammar School
Sussex cricketers